Portrait of a Young Venetian Woman is a small bust-length oil on elm panel painting by the German artist Albrecht Dürer from 1505. It was executed, along with a number of other high-society portraits, during his second visit to Italy.

The woman wears a patterned gown with tied-on sleeves that show the chemise beneath. Her hair frames her face in soft waves, and back hair is confined in a small draped cap. The work's harmony and grace is achieved through its mixtures of tones, from her pale, elegant skin and reddish blond hair to her black-and pearl necklace and highly-fashionable patterned dress; all of which are highlighted against a flat black background. It is similar in pose and colour tone to his c. 1507 A German Woman from Venice, while at least two studies of Venetian women are known, both of which are very daring. One shows the model with a plunging neckline, the other with bare shoulders.

During his visit to Italy Dürer became fascinated by Giovanni Bellini, eventually becoming friends. Bellini was already an established master when Dürer was still relatively unknown outside of Germany. The Franconian artist's influence can be seen in this work's soft modeling, dramatic lighting and vivid colours and tones.

The work was not identified as a Dürer original until it was found in a private Lithuanian collection in 1923. The identity of the sitter is lost; however, in dress and hairstyle, she appears to be Venetian, rather than Germanic. The portrait is unfinished; a number of elements, noticeably the black bow above her chest, are not as well described as other passages.

See also
 100 Great Paintings

References

Sources
 

Venetian Woman
1505 paintings
Paintings in the collection of the Kunsthistorisches Museum
Venetian Woman